Mateo Ružić (born 16 August 1994) is a Croatian sprinter specialising in the 400 metres. He has represented his country at two outdoor and two indoor European Championships.

International competitions

Personal bests

Outdoor
200 metres – 21.37 (-0.3 m/s, Novo Mesto 2017)
400 metres – 46.13 (Velenje 2017)
400 metres hurdles – 51.49 (Zagreb 2016)
Indoor
200 metres – 22.01 (Vienna 2014)
400 metres – 46.74 (Linz 2017)

References

1994 births
Living people
Croatian male sprinters
Competitors at the 2017 Summer Universiade
Competitors at the 2019 Summer Universiade
Mediterranean Games competitors for Croatia
Athletes (track and field) at the 2022 Mediterranean Games
20th-century Croatian people
21st-century Croatian people